Bilate zuria woreda is one of the woredas in the s' Region of Ethiopia. Part of the Sidama regione located in the Great Rift Valley, Bilate zuria is bordered on the south by boricha, on the west by the Wolayita Zone, on the northwest by the Oromia Region, on the northeast by Darara, and on the southeast by Dale. Bilate was separated from Boricha woreda.

Demographics 
Based on the 2007 Census conducted by the CSA, this woreda has a total population of 450,260, of whom 225,524 are men and 224,736 women; 10,402 or 4.16% of its population are urban dwellers. The majority of the inhabitants were Protestants, with 77.9% of the population reporting that belief, 8.94% were Catholic, 8.22% were Muslim, 1.81% observed traditional religions, and 1.14% practiced Ethiopian Orthodox Christianity.

Notes 

Districts of the Southern Nations, Nationalities, and Peoples' Region